Sandettie is a lightvessel station located at Sandettie Bank in the North Sea. It is one of the 22 coastal weather stations whose conditions are reported in the BBC Shipping Forecast. The vessel is named after her location on the Sandettie Bank, due north of Calais and due east of the South Foreland. The ship has no engine and is not crewed. Its lights are powered by solar panels.

The previous Sandettie lightship was taken out of service in 1989 and is now a museum ship moored in Dunkirk harbour museum (fr). In 2019 Simon Armitage published a collection of poems named Sandettie Light Vessel Automatic after the lightvessel's weather station.

External links 
The optical and acoustic signaling scheme and the radio-signal scheme of Sandettie lightvessel, ie the signal pattern of the light signal, the fog horn and the radio stationin accordance with NOTICE TO MARINERS 2/2012 C1 Sandettie Light Vessel No.2/12 C1, by Order Captain R. H. Barker, Director of Navigational Requirements, Trinity House, London, EC3N 4DH, 11 January 2012
Article about the lightship in the French Wikipedia

Observations and Weather
The detailed, hourly measured values of the lightship Sandettie the last 24 hours of metoffice.gov.uk
 The exact course of the air temperature and water temperature as well as the water height in the area of Sandettie Bank on the web page of the Channel Swimming & Piloting Federation on the basis of the data of Sandettie Lightvessel
Weather forecast and wave prediction for the area of the sandbank for skipper from Meteo Consult Marine, (fr)

References

Lightships of the United Kingdom
Lighthouses of the English Channel
Lightship stations